Vítor Costa de Brito (born 1 July 1994) is a Brazilian professional footballer who plays as a left back for Marítimo.

Honours
CSA
Campeonato Alagoano: 2021

References

1994 births
Living people
Brazilian footballers
Brazilian expatriate footballers
Association football defenders
Esporte Clube Bahia players
Avaí FC players
F.C. Arouca players
C.D. Aves players
RC Lens players
Centro Sportivo Alagoano players
C.S. Marítimo players
Primeira Liga players
Ligue 2 players
Campeonato Brasileiro Série B players
Brazilian expatriate sportspeople in Portugal
Expatriate footballers in Portugal